Conflict and Catastrophe Medicine is a small medical specialty that operates within disaster areas whether they are natural or human caused disasters. Currently many healthcare professionals are involved in the Ebola crisis of 2014. Conflict and Catastrophe medicine is a specialized form of humanitarian aid

History
Conflict and Catastrophe Medicine has for many years operated both informally and as the remit of the military or governmental peacekeeping organisations such as the United Nations. It is a small medical specialty and in civilian terms has been operating informally for many years. In recent years there has been a formalizing of the role of conflict and catastrophe medicine and in 2005 both the Society of Apothecaries and Royal Society of Medicine formed a faculty and a forum respectively.

Organisations working within education of Conflict and Catastrophe
Faculty of Conflict and Castastrophe medicine
Royal Society of Medicine

Qualifications within Conflict and Catastrophe medicine
As it is a small specialty, there are few mainstream qualifications within conflict and catastrophe medicine however there are a number of training opportunities and a Postgraduate qualification offered by the Society of Apothecaries called the Diploma in the Medical Care of Catastrophes.

Organisations working within Conflict and Catastrophe Environments
RedR
Medecins sans Frontieres

References

External links
RedR Homepage

Emergency medicine
Medical specialties